Valentina Patruno was born in Caracas, Venezuela on September 6, 1982. She was the official representative of Venezuela to the Miss World 2003 pageant held in Sanya, China on December 6, 2003, where she placed in the top 20.

References

External links
Miss Venezuela Official Website
Miss World Official Website
Miss Italia Nel Mondo Official Website

1982 births
Living people
Venezuelan female models
Miss Venezuela
Miss World 2003 delegates
21st-century Venezuelan women